Robert John ("Jack") Mee (25 September 1867 – 6 February 1941) was an English first-class cricketer active 1887–96 who played for Nottinghamshire. He was born and died in Shelford.

References

1867 births
1941 deaths
English cricketers
Nottinghamshire cricketers
Marylebone Cricket Club cricketers
Staffordshire cricketers
East of England cricketers
People from Rushcliffe (district)
Cricketers from Nottinghamshire
C. I. Thornton's XI cricketers